Bucking the Truth is a 1926 American silent Western film directed by Milburn Morante and starring Pete Morrison, Brinsley Shaw and Bruce Gordon.

Cast
 Pete Morrison as 'Slim' Duane 
 Brinsley Shaw as 'Coarse Gold' Charlie 
 Bruce Gordon as Matt Holden 
 William La Roche as Eben Purkiss 
 Slim Whitaker as 'Red' Sang 
 Ione Reed as Anne 
 O. Robertson as Tom Bailey 
 Vester Pegg as Sheriff Findlay

References

External links
 

1926 films
1926 Western (genre) films
Universal Pictures films
Films directed by Milburn Morante
American black-and-white films
Silent American Western (genre) films
1920s English-language films
1920s American films